Ri Song-gum (born 17 October 1997) is a North Korean female weightlifter, competing in the 49 kg category and representing North Korea at international competitions.

She competed at world championships, most recently at the 2015 World Weightlifting Championships.

Major results

References

External links

1997 births
Living people
North Korean female weightlifters
Place of birth missing (living people)
Weightlifters at the 2014 Summer Youth Olympics
Universiade medalists in weightlifting
Asian Games medalists in weightlifting
Weightlifters at the 2018 Asian Games
Medalists at the 2018 Asian Games
Asian Games gold medalists for North Korea
Universiade gold medalists for North Korea
World Weightlifting Championships medalists